MX5 may refer to:

 Mazda MX-5, a roadster sports car
 Dongfeng Fengdu MX5, a compact crossover sport utility vehicle
 Meizu MX5, a smartphone
 MX5, an ethernet router in the Juniper MX-Series
 MX-5, a lunar lander design from Moon Express